The 1910 Southwestern Louisiana Industrial football team was an American football team that represented the Southwestern Louisiana Industrial Institute (now known as the University of Louisiana at Lafayette) as an independent during the 1910 college football season. In their third year under head coach Clement J. McNaspy, the team compiled a 6–2–1 record.

Schedule

References

Louisiana Ragin' Cajuns football seasons